Cobwebs is a Big Finish Productions audio drama based on the long-running British science fiction television series Doctor Who.  It was aired on BBC Radio 4 Extra from 16 to 19 May 2011.

Plot

Half a century after her travels in the TARDIS, Nyssa reunites with the Doctor, Tegan and Turlough, days after they left her.

Cast

The Doctor – Peter Davison
Tegan Jovanka – Janet Fielding
Nyssa – Sarah Sutton
Vislor Turlough – Mark Strickson
Director Cardell/Ship's Computer – Helen Griffin
Loki/Edgar/Hawks – Raymond Coulthard
Enforcement Officer Bragg – Adrian Lukis
Bio Technician Valis/Echelon – Charlotte Lucas

Continuity
The play occurs after Enlightenment with a much older Nyssa briefly rejoining her friends at the same ages she left them.

Notes
Helen Griffin appeared in the TV story Rise of the Cybermen / The Age of Steel

It is only the second Big Finish audio play that Fielding had appeared in, after 2006's The Gathering.

Critical reception
Matt Michael, writing for Doctor Who Magazine, praised the audio drama, welcoming the opportunity to hear this TARDIS crew for the first time since 1983, and calling it "strong stuff".

References

External links
Cobwebs

2010 audio plays
Fifth Doctor audio plays